Sir Edward Jonathan Somers  (9 September 1928 – 3 June 2002) was a New Zealand jurist and member of the Privy Council.

Biography
Somers was born in Christchurch in 1928, and was educated at Christ's College and the University of Canterbury, where he gained a Bachelor of Arts and a Bachelor of Laws. In 1952, Somers became engaged to Mollie Louise Morison, and they later married and went on to have three children.

Somers practised as a barrister and solicitor between 1952 and 1971, and solely as a barrister thereafter. In 1973, he was appointed Queen's Counsel, and the following year he became a judge of the Supreme Court (now High Court). He was appointed a judge of the Court of Appeal in 1981, a role from which he retired in 1990. In 1981, he was also appointed to the Privy Council.

Somers was a part-time lecturer at the University of Canterbury from 1954 to 1974.

In 1998, Somers was appointed by the British government to be a member of the Bloody Sunday Inquiry. He resigned from that role for personal reasons in 2000.

Somers died of cancer in Christchurch in 2002. His wife, Louise, Lady Somers, died in Christchurch in 2021.

Honours
In the 1989 Queen's Birthday Honours, Somers was appointed a Knight Bachelor. He was awarded an honorary Doctor of Laws by the University of Canterbury in 1992.

References

1928 births
2002 deaths
People from Christchurch
People educated at Christ's College, Christchurch
University of Canterbury alumni
Academic staff of the University of Canterbury
20th-century New Zealand judges
New Zealand King's Counsel
High Court of New Zealand judges
Court of Appeal of New Zealand judges
Members of the Judicial Committee of the Privy Council
New Zealand Knights Bachelor
New Zealand members of the Privy Council of the United Kingdom
Deaths from cancer in New Zealand